Diethylbenzene (DEB) refers to any of three isomers with the formula C6H4(C2H5)2.  Each consists of a benzene ring and two ethyl substituents.  The meta and para have the greater commercial significance.  All are colorless liquids.

Nomenclature
 Ortho: known as 1,2-diethylbenzene and o-diethylbenzene.
 Meta: known as 1,3-diethylbenzene and m-diethylbenzene.
 Para: known as 1,4-diethylbenzene and p-diethylbenzene.

Production and applications 
Diethylbenzenes arise as side-products of the alkylation of benzene with ethylene, which can described as two steps.  The first step is the industrial route to ethylbenzene, which is produced on a large scale as a precursor to styrene.
C6H6  +  C2H4   →   C6H5C2H5
The diethylbenzene is an inadvertent side product.
C6H5C2H5  +  C2H4   →   C6H4(C2H5)2
Using shape-selective zeolite catalysts, the para isomer can be produced in high selectivity.

Much diethylbenzene is recycled by transalkylation to give ethylbenzene:
 C6H4(C2H5)2  +  C6H6   →   2 C6H5C2H5

Uses
Diethylbenzene is used in a mixture with methyl and/or ethyl biphenyls as a low temperature heat transfer fluid.  

Diethylbenzene is dehydrogenated to give divinylbenzene (DVB):
 C6H4(C2H5)2   →   C6H4(C2H3)2  +  2 H2

DVB is used in the production of crosslinked polystyrene.

References 

Alkylbenzenes